Uptight is an Australian music television series which aired on ATV-0 in Melbourne from 1967 until 1969 on Saturday mornings at 8am to 12pm, it was hosted by singer Ross D. Wyllie.

A compilation album, Uptight – Party Time, by Ross D. Wyllie and the Uptight Party Team, was issued via Calendar/Festival Records in 1968. The record was produced by Roger Savage. It features two medleys of then-current songs including, "Midnight Hour", "You Are My Sunshine" and "Day Tripper".

In August 2003 Wyllie compered a reunion stage show, Uptight, with the line-up of fellow 1960s artists and regular performers: Jim Keays (The Masters Apprentices), Marcie Jones, Ronnie Charles (The Groop, Bobby Bright (Bobbie and Laurie), and the Strangers at Melbourne's Palais Theatre.

References 

General
  Note: Archived [on-line] copy has limited functionality.
Specific

Network 10 original programming
Australian music television series
1967 Australian television series debuts
1969 Australian television series endings
Black-and-white Australian television shows
English-language television shows